"Cuidao por Ahí" (stylized in upper case; English: "Careful Around There") is a song by Colombian singer J Balvin and Puerto Rican rapper Bad Bunny from their collaborative album Oasis. The song was released on 23 August 2019 as the fourth single from the project. Billboard magazine ranked it as the 33rd best song of 2019.

Composition 
The song contains a "menacing, sometimes disturbing beat", with J Balvin leading the opening lines, "chanting and singing in a register far lower than usual", followed by Bad Bunny's "higher voice". Billboard called the song a "musical switch whose success underscores how seamlessly these two work together", and asserted that if Bad Bunny is the "bad guy" in Oasis, then "Cuidao por Ahí" is a role reversal.

Commercial performance  
Like the rest of the songs of Oasis, "Cuidao por Ahí" managed to chart on the Billboard Hot Latin Songs chart, peaking at number 28.

Music video  
The music video for "Cuidao por Ahí" was released on 23 August 2019 and was directed by Colin Tilley. Its odd imagery and direction was noted by various journalists.

Charts

Certifications

References 

2019 singles
2019 songs
J Balvin songs
Bad Bunny songs
Spanish-language songs
Music videos directed by Colin Tilley
Songs written by Bad Bunny
Songs written by J Balvin